David James Brandt (born September 25, 1977) is a former American football offensive lineman.  He played professionally in the National Football League (NFL) for the Washington Redskins (2001–2002) and San Diego Chargers (2003–2004).  He played college football at the University of Michigan.  He was undrafted during the 2001 NFL Draft, but was signed as a free agent by the Redskins.

As of 2010, he has been an assistant coach at Grand Rapids Christian High School in Grand Rapids, Michigan.  Brandt's sister, Julie Glass, is a leading roller derby skater.

References

1977 births
Living people
American football offensive linemen
Michigan Wolverines football players
Washington Redskins players
San Diego Chargers players
Players of American football from Grand Rapids, Michigan